Martin Dean may refer to:

 Martin C. Dean (born 1962), research scholar at the Center for Advanced Holocaust Studies
 Martin R. Dean (born 1955), Swiss writer